Vanderlei Silva de Oliveira or simply Vanderlei (born 18 June 1977) is a former Brazilian football player.

References

1977 births
Living people
Brazilian footballers
América Futebol Clube (SP) players
Volta Redonda FC players
Londrina Esporte Clube players
FC Spartak Vladikavkaz players
Russian Premier League players
Brazilian expatriate footballers
Expatriate footballers in Russia
Association football defenders
FC Rostov players